Tikuliya may refer to:

Tikuliya, Narayani, Nepal
Tikuliya, Sagarmatha, Nepal
Tikuliya, Bihar, India